Cascia Hall Preparatory School is an Augustinian Roman Catholic coeducational College-preparatory day school in Tulsa, Oklahoma. It is a member of the Augustinian Secondary Education Association. It is one of Tulsa's two Catholic high schools, with Bishop Kelley High School.

History
Cascia Hall was founded by the Province of St. Thomas of Villanova, of the Order of Saint Augustine, in 1926 at its current location, a  campus at 2520 South Yorktown Avenue in midtown Tulsa. The school's first headmaster was Francis A. Driscoll, who had previously been president of Villanova College (now Villanova University).  The school is named after St. Rita of Cascia.

Cascia Hall was an all-male day school, which accepted boarders, until 1986, when it ceased to take boarders, added a middle school, and became a coeducational day school for grades 6-12. It has a total enrollment of about 525, about 45% of whom are Roman Catholic. Cascia Hall follows the Augustinian tradition of education, which traces its heritage to the educational philosophy of Saint Augustine of Hippo.

Athletics 
Various sports are offered including:

Fall Sports - cheerleading (middle and upper school), cross country (middle and upper school), football (middle and upper school), and volleyball (middle and upper school).

Winter Sports - basketball (middle and upper school), and wrestling (middle and upper school).

Spring Sports - baseball (upper school), golf (middle and upper school), lacrosse (middle and upper school), soccer (upper school), tennis (middle and upper school), and track (middle and upper school).

Fine and Performing Arts 
Cascia Hall offers programs in Theatre, Music, Visual Arts, and Speech and Debate

Notable people
Notable people who attended, or were otherwise associated with, Cascia Hall include:
G. T. Bynum, mayor of Tulsa, 2016–present
John F. Reif, Chief Justice of the Oklahoma Supreme Court 2015-16
Bill Hader, actor/comedian and repertory player, on Saturday Night Live.
Frank Keating, Governor of Oklahoma 1995-2003
Bill LaFortune, Mayor of Tulsa, 2002-06
Robert J. LaFortune, Mayor of Tulsa, 1970-78
Gailard Sartain, actor (attended Cascia Hall, but graduated from Will Rogers High School)
G. G. Smith, college basketball head coach, High Point University
Lovie Smith, NFL and college football head coach (assistant football coach at Cascia Hall 1981–1982)
Lauren Stamile, professional actress, best known for her recurring role as "Nurse Rose" on the ABC series Grey's Anatomy.
Iciss Tillis, professional women's basketball player
Blake Towsley, contestant on 11th season of Survivor
R. A. Lafferty, American science fiction and fantasy writer

References

External links
Cascia Hall Preparatory School Homepage
Augnet International Cooperative Web Site for Schools in the Tradition of St. Augustine
Midwest Augustinians Province of Our Mother of Good Counsel

Roman Catholic Diocese of Tulsa
Catholic secondary schools in Oklahoma
Cascia Hall Preparatory School
Private middle schools in Oklahoma
Educational institutions established in 1926
Schools in Tulsa, Oklahoma
1926 establishments in Oklahoma